Fraidy Cat is a 1951 short subject directed by Jules White starring American comedian Joe Besser and radio disc jockey Jim Hawthorne (billed as "Hawthorne"). It is the third entry in the Joe Besser series released by Columbia Pictures starring the comedian, who appeared in ten comedies at the studio between 1949 and 1956.

Plot
Wide Awake Detective Agency investigators Joe and Hawthorne have been unable to solve the antique robberies perpetrated by The Ape Man Gang. Their superior, I. Katchum (Tom Kennedy) gives them one final opportunity to solve the case. Guarding an antique shop late at night, the duo eventually confront the gang of crooks who have trained a real gorilla to carry out the thefts.

Production notes
Fraidy Cat was filmed on July 23–26, 1951. It is a scene-for-scene remake of the 1943 Three Stooges film Dizzy Detectives using occasional stock footage. Fraidy Cat was itself remade in 1955 as Hook a Crook, using stock footage as well. Jules White directed all three films.

References

External links
 
Fraidy Cat at threestooges.net

1951 films
American black-and-white films
Films directed by Jules White
1951 comedy films
Columbia Pictures short films
American comedy short films
1950s English-language films
1950s American films